The Walter–Gimble House is a historic building located in the west end of Davenport, Iowa, United States. It has been listed on the National Register of Historic Places since 1983.

History
Bernhart and Agnes Walter lived here beginning in 1890 and lived here for a few years. He worked as a brewer at the Kohler & Lange Brewery. J.J. Gimble, who was a blacksmith, and his wife Mary lived here after the Walters. The city directories do not list who the previous occupants of the house were.

Architecture
The house appears to be an expansion of the three-bay McClellan style, which was popular in Davenport after the Civil War. The four-bay house follows a rectangular plan. There is an entrance on the second floor, which suggests the house may have been a duplex from its early years.

References

Houses completed in 1875
Houses in Davenport, Iowa
Houses on the National Register of Historic Places in Iowa
National Register of Historic Places in Davenport, Iowa